The Nicholls Colonels cross country program represents Nicholls State University in Thibodaux, Louisiana, United States. The program includes separate men's and women's cross country teams, both of which compete in the Southland Conference, which is part of the National Collegiate Athletic Association's Division I. The teams are coached by Stefanie Slekis.

See also
Nicholls Colonels

References

External links